Rebecca School is an independent private day school in New York City that specializes in teaching children ages four to twenty-one who have a range of neurodevelopmental disorders, including autism spectrum disorder (ASD). The school was founded in 2006 and uses a special teaching method known as Floortime/DIR (Developmental, Individual-difference, Relationship-based) developed by Stanley Greenspan, M.D., a child psychiatrist and specialist in autism education who died in 2010. Greenspan's method was a change from the more traditional methods that sought to change behavior through conditioning using rewards and punishments. His method focuses on children's ability to build relationships. Rebecca School's space and facilities on East 30th Street were specially designed for the needs of autistic and special needs children, based on Dr. Greenspan's ideas. The school utilizes not only teachers who are trained to work with special needs students, but also social workers who work with the families of the students.

Rebecca School is one of a number of independent private schools in New York City that are owned by MetSchools, Inc., which was founded by Michael C. Koffler. Other schools run by the organization include Williamsburg Northside, Aaron School, and Montclare Children’s School.

Rebecca School also serves as a case study for Dr. Stanley Greenspan and Dr. Gil Tippy's book, Respecting Autism, released by MetSchools Publishing in 2011.

References

External links 
 Official Rebecca School website
 Official Dr. Stanley Greenspan website
 Official MetSchools, LLC website

Autism-related organizations in the United States
Private elementary schools in Manhattan
Private high schools in Manhattan
Private middle schools in Manhattan
Schools for people on the autistic spectrum
Special schools in the United States
Educational institutions established in 2006
2006 establishments in New York City
For profit schools in Manhattan